Deviant Records was a London-based electronic music record label founded by publisher and music producer Rob Deacon in 1994. They published bands such as Pentatonik, Node (Flood, Ed Buller, Mel Wesson, Dave Bessell), Schematix, The Orb, Humate, Phat Gecko (Luke Corradine), Spooky, and Witchman. Deviant grew to be one a major independent dance label and represented Paul Van Dyk, now one of the world's most successful DJs, and DJ Sammy. Disillusioned by the corporate consolidation within the music industry, as well as the increase in music downloads, Deacon sold Deviant Records to Phoenix Music International Ltd. in 2006. He died on 8 September 2007 in a canoeing accident.

References

British record labels
Trance record labels
Electronic music record labels
Record labels established in 1994
Record labels disestablished in 2006
Defunct record labels of the United Kingdom